Judith Ann Blair  (née Dunlop; born 29 November 1941) is a former New Zealand netball player. She played 19 international matches for the New Zealand team between 1960 and 1967, including captaining the side to victory at the 1967 World Netball Championships.

Early life
Blair was born Judith Ann Dunlop on 29 November 1941, the daughter of Ernest and Monica Daphne Dunlop. She was educated at Linwood High School in Christchurch. After leaving school, she found employment as a leather worker.

Netball career
Dunlop began playing representative netball for Canterbury in 1956, and first gained South Island selection in 1958. In 1959, it was said that "although short, she moves well into the circle and is outstandingly quick on rebounds. She is a most unselfish player, and although an accurate shot herself, passes well to the goal shooter."

In 1960, Dunlop was selected for the New Zealand team that toured Australia. She played in 14 of the 16 games on tour, including in all three Test matches, and was considered to be one of the most improved players in the team. Her play on tour as goal shooter was described as "outstanding". However, the second and third Tests of the series were won by Australia, 44–39 and 46–45, respectively.

By the inaugural World Netball Championships at Eastbourne, England, in 1963, Dunlop had married, and was known by her married name. At the tournament, New Zealand recorded nine wins and one loss, 36–37 against Australia, to finish as runners-up. In the game against , won by New Zealand 56–29, Blair played at goal attack and was reported as "working accurately and in perfect unison" with goal shooter Colleen McMaster.

After the disappointment of narrowly finishing second at Eastbourne, Blair gave birth to her first child but continued playing netball, moving positions to wing attack where her explosive speed and deception were ideal. She was named as captain of the New Zealand team for the 1967 World Netball Championships in Perth, where New Zealand won all seven of their matches to become world champions for the first time.

Across her international career, Blair played in 19 Test matches, and she was unbeaten as captain. After retiring, she remained involved in netball, and received a coaching certificate in 1975.

Later life
In 1972, Blair gave birth to her daughter Belinda, who would also go on to play netball for New Zealand. They were the first mother and daughter to represent New Zealand in netball.

In the 2006 Queen's Birthday Honours, Blair was appointed a Member of the New Zealand Order of Merit, for services to netball.

References

External link
Blair interviewed as part of a film about the New Zealand team's trip by ship to the 1953 World Championships in England

1941 births
Living people
Netball players from Christchurch
People educated at Linwood College
New Zealand international netball players
New Zealand netball players
Members of the New Zealand Order of Merit
1963 World Netball Championships players
1967 World Netball Championships players